Hartwood is a village in Scotland.

Hartwood may also refer to:

Hartwood, Ohio, an unincorporated community
Hartwood, Virginia, an unincorporated community

See also
Heartwood (disambiguation)